The Journal of Statistical Computation and Simulation is a peer-reviewed scientific journal that covers computational statistics. It is published by Taylor & Francis and was established in 1972. The editors-in-chief are Richard Krutchkoff (Virginia Polytechnic Institute and State University, Blacksburg) and Andrei Volodin (University of Regina).

Abstracting and indexing
The journal is abstracted and indexed in:
Current Index to Statistics
Science Citation Index Expanded
Zentralblatt MATH
According to the Journal Citation Reports, the journal has a 2018 impact factor of 0.767.

References

External links

Computational statistics journals
Statistics journals
Publications established in 1972